Dentobunus is a genus of harvestmen in the family Sclerosomatidae from Southeast Asia.

Species
 Dentobunus abiannulatus Roewer, 1929
 Dentobunus acuarius (Thorell, 1891)
 Dentobunus albimaculatus 
 Dentobunus auratus Roewer, 1910
 Dentobunus aurolucens Roewer, 1923
 Dentobunus balicus Roewer, 1931
 Dentobunus bicorniger (Simon, 1901)
 Dentobunus bidentatus (Thorell, 1891)
 Dentobunus basalis Roewer, 1931
 Dentobunus bicoronatus Roewer, 1931
 Dentobunus buruensis Roewer, 1955
 Dentobunus chaetopus (Thorell, 1889)
 Dentobunus cupreus Roewer, 1955
 Dentobunus dentatus (With, 1903)
 Dentobunus distichus Roewer, 1955
 Dentobunus feuerborni Roewer, 1931
 Dentobunus imperator (With, 1903)
 Dentobunus insignitus Roewer, 1910
 Dentobunus kraepelinii Roewer, 1910
 Dentobunus luteus Roewer, 1910
 Dentobunus magnificus Roewer, 1912
 Dentobunus pulcher Suzuki, 1970
 Dentobunus punctipes Roewer, 1931
 Dentobunus quadridentatus Roewer, 1923
 Dentobunus quadrispinosus Suzuki, 1977
 Dentobunus ramicornis (Thorell, 1894)
 Dentobunus renchi Roewer, 1931
 Dentobunus rufus Roewer, 1910
 Dentobunus selangoris Roewer, 1955
 Dentobunus siamensis Roewer, 1955
 Dentobunus tenuis (Loman, 1892)
 Dentobunus unicolor Roewer, 1911
 Dentobunus waigenensis Roewer, 1955

References

Harvestmen